The universe is all of time and space and their contents.

Universe may also refer to:

Science and technology

Mathematics
 Universe (mathematics), a class large enough to contain all sets one may wish to use
 Universal set, a mathematical set which contains all objects, including itself

Computing
 Universe (Unix), variant of the working environment in some operating systems
 UniVerse, a MultiValue database platform
 Electric Image Animation System or Universe, 3D computer graphics package

Arts, media and entertainment

Publications
 Universe (anthology series), science fiction anthologies edited by Terry Carr
 Universe: The Definitive Visual Guide, 2005 nonfiction book by nine British authors
 The Universe (Catholic newspaper), British Roman Catholic newspaper
 The Universe (student newspaper), publication at Brigham Young University
 "Universe", 1941 novella by Robert A. Heinlein later published as the first half of Orphans of the Sky
 Wszechświat or Universe, Polish popular-science journal

Film and television
 Universe (1960 film), black-and-white animated documentary short 
 Universe (1976 film), documentary short
 Universe, 1980–1982 television newsmagazine hosted by Walter Cronkite
 The Universe (TV series), 2007–2015 documentary TV series
 Stargate Universe, science fiction TV series
 Stephen Hawking's Universe, 1997 documentary
 Universe, 2021 documentary TV series by Brian Cox
 Our Universe

Music
 Ibanez Universe, guitar by the Ibanez company
 Universe Symphony (Ives), unfinished classical work

Albums
 Universe (Dead Brain Cells album)
 Universe (Hampton Hawes album), 1972
 Universe (Koda Kumi album), 2010
 Universe (Kyoko Fukada album), 2001
 Universe (Modern Talking album), 2003
 Universe (Mohombi album), 2014
 Universe (Planet X album), 2000
 Universe (Exo EP), 2017
 Universe (Sarah Slean EP), 1998
 Universe (Truckfighters album), 2014
 Universe (NCT album), 2021
 Universes (album), a 2008 album by Birds of Tokyo

Songs
 "Universe" (Exo song), 2017
 "Universe", a song by Loona from 12:00
 "Universe" (Savage Garden song), 1997
 "Universe" (ShuuKaRen song), 2016
 "Universe" (Slade song), 1991
 "Universe", a song by Alien Ant Farm from Anthology
 "Universe", a song by Mohombi from his album Universe
 "Universe", a song by Scars on Broadway from Scars on Broadway
 "The Universe!", a song by Do Make Say Think from the album You, You're a History in Rust
 "III. Universe" and/or "V. Universe", songs by the Microphones from Mount Eerie
 "Universe (Let's Play Ball)", a song by NCT-U from their album Universe, 2021

Games and video games
 Universe (1983 video game), science fiction video game by Omnitrend Software
 Universe (1994 video game), adventure game by Core Design
 Universe (role-playing game), science fiction tabletop role-playing game
 Universe, a pentomino board made by Parker Brothers

Other arts and entertainment
 Universes (theatre ensemble), a New York City based hip hop poetic theatre ensemble
 The World (Tarot card), a Tarot card also referred to as "The Universe"
 Universe (Danish amusement park), a science and amusement park in Denmark

Sport
 Frankfurt Universe, an American football team from Frankfurt, Germany
 Universe (video game player) (Saahil Arora, born 1989), American professional Dota 2 player

Other uses
 Universe (economics), a population to be studied or measured
 Universe (yacht), a 2018 Dutch superyacht
 The Universe (Dubai), a man-made archipelago in Dubai, United Arab Emirates
 Hyundai Universe, a bus produced by Hyundai Motor Company

See also
 "My Universe", a song by Coldplay from the 2021 album Music of the Spheres
 Captain Universe, a fictional superhero appearing in Marvel Comics
 Fictional universe, a self-consistent setting for several stories
 Observable universe, a region of space surrounding Earth
 Universe of discourse, the relevant set for a purpose
 Everything (disambiguation)
 Omniverse (disambiguation)
 Megaverse (disambiguation)
 Metaverse (disambiguation)
 Multiverse (disambiguation)
 Parallel universe (disambiguation)
 Univers, a font
 Universal (disambiguation)
 University, an educational and research institution
 Universum (disambiguation)
 Universo (disambiguation)
 Youniverse (disambiguation)